Austine Igbinosa  (born 19 December 1980) is a former professional footballer who played as a midfielder. 
 He joined Ekstraklasa club Zagłębie Lubin from Italian side Reggiana and made two appearances. He was the first Togolese player to appear in the Polish first tier.

References

1980 births
Living people
Togolese footballers
Nigerian footballers
Association football forwards
Ekstraklasa players
Shooting Stars S.C. players
A.C. Reggiana 1919 players
Zagłębie Lubin players
Togolese expatriate footballers
Togolese expatriate sportspeople in Italy
Expatriate footballers in Italy
Togolese expatriate sportspeople in Poland
Expatriate footballers in Poland
21st-century Togolese people